The HTC Gene, also known as HTC P3400i or HTC P3400 is a PDA smartphone developed by the HTC Corporation, that was announced on February, 2007. It is powered by a TI OMAP 850 200 MHz processor and runs the Microsoft Windows Mobile 6 Professional  for HTC Gene P3400i and Microsoft Windows Mobile 5.0 Pocket PC for HTC Gene P3400 operating system. It includes an TFT resistive touchscreen with 65K colors and a 2-megapixel camera. The carrier bound names for this phone include Dopod D600.

Specification sheet

Upgrading HTC Gene 

There are no official updates available for HTC Gene but it is upgradable to Windows Mobile 6.5.X. Click here for more information

Android on HTC Gene 

Wing Linux, a version of Android, is currently in process of development. Click here for more information.

See also 
 HTC Corporation
 Windows Mobile
 Pocket PC
 PDA

External links 
 HTC Gene P3400i product page
 HTC Gene P3400 product page
 Upgrading HTC Gene P3400i/P3400 Guide

Gene
Windows Mobile Professional devices